The Whole Truth may refer to:

Film and television 
 The Whole Truth (1923 film), a film starring Stan Laurel
 The Whole Truth (1958 film), a British film directed by John Guillermin
 The Whole Truth (2009 film), an American comedy starring Eric Roberts, Elisabeth Röhm, and Sean Patrick Flanery
 The Whole Truth (2016 film), an American thriller film starring Keanu Reeves
 The Whole Truth (2021 film), a Thai mystery thriller film
 The Whole Truth (TV series), a 2010 American legal drama series
 "The Whole Truth" (The Twilight Zone), an episode
 "The Whole Truth" (Lost), an episode 
 "The Whole Truth" (Medium), an episode

Other
 The Whole Truth (play), a 1956 play by Philip Mackie, basis for the 1958 film
 The Whole Truth (Point of Grace album), 1995
 The Whole Truth (Da' T.R.U.T.H. album), 2011
 The Whole Truth (novel), a novel by David Baldacci
 The Whole Truth, a novel by Janice Kaplan

See also
 Sworn testimony